Thermograpta is a monotypic moth genus in the family Erebidae. Its single species, Thermograpta rufizonata, is found in New Guinea. Both the genus and species were first described by George Hampson in 1914.

References

Nudariina
Monotypic moth genera
Moths described in 1914
Moths of New Guinea